Mount Ptolemy is an isolated block mountain with four main summits, the highest rising to 1,370 meters. It lies close north of the Traffic Circle on the northwestern side of Mercator Ice Piedmont, Antarctic Peninsula. First observed by Finn Ronne and Carl Eklund of the U.S. Antarctic Service, 1939–41, from their sledge route through the Traffic Circle. Surveyed by Falkland Islands Dependencies Survey (FIDS) in 1947. Named by United Kingdom Antarctic Place-Names Committee (UK-APC) after Claudius Ptolemy (2nd century AD), Egyptian mathematician, astronomer and geographer, who introduced the system of coordinates of latitude and longitude for fixing positions on the Earth's surface.

References

Mountains of Graham Land
Bowman Coast